Courtney Atkinson (born 15 August 1979) is a professional Australian triathlete born in Mackay, Queensland.

Atkinson was a member of Australia's 2008 Olympic triathlon team, where he finished 11th in men's triathlon, and the 2012 Olympic triathlon team where he placed 18th. Additionally in his career Atkinson won the Men's International Triathlon Union (ITU) 2009 World Cup races in Mooloolaba and Ishigaki and had won four consecutive Australian Junior Triathlon Championships from 1996 to 1999. In 2002, 2003 and 2004 he was Australia's Triathlete of the Year.

Atkinson moved to the 70.3 IRONMAN distance in 2013 and won his first event in Cairns

References

External links
 Courtney Atkinson's Website
Courtney's Red Bull Athlete Profile
Red Bull Project Courtney runs through Australia

1979 births
Living people
Australian male triathletes
Triathletes at the 2008 Summer Olympics
Triathletes at the 2012 Summer Olympics
Olympic triathletes of Australia
Bond University alumni
Sportspeople from the Gold Coast, Queensland
20th-century Australian people
21st-century Australian people